Mary-Lou Pardue is an American geneticist who is an emeritus professor in the Department of Biology at the Massachusetts Institute of Technology, which she originally joined in 1972. Her research focused on the role of telomeres in chromosome replication, particularly in Drosophila (fruit flies).

Early life and education
Pardue received a bachelor's degree in biology in 1955 from the College of William and Mary. She received a master's degree in radiation biology in 1959 from the University of Tennessee, where she had been eligible for a Ph.D. but convinced the department to give her the master's degree instead, later explaining in an interview that "in the society I was in it was quite all right for a wife to be going to school, but getting a Ph.D. was a little too serious". She subsequently worked for several years as a research technician before returning to graduate school at Yale University, from which she received a Ph.D. in biology in 1970. She worked under the supervision of Joseph Gall, whose support of women in his research laboratory was considered highly unusual at the time.  Pardue then became a postdoctoral fellow with Max Birnstiel at the University of Edinburgh.

Academic career
As Pardue later described the process, her search for a faculty position in the early 1970s coincided with broad interest in United States academic institutions in hiring women, and she was surprised to be heavily recruited. After initially being rejected by MIT, she was subsequently offered an associate professor position there and accepted it in part because other offers were for more junior assistant professor positions, and in part because the department already had other women faculty. She became a full professor in the department in 1980. In 1995, Pardue became the first Boris Magasanik Professor of Biology. Pardue was among the women faculty who organized with fellow MIT biologist Nancy Hopkins in the mid-1990s to bring complaints of institutional discrimination against women to then-dean Charles Vest.

Pardue became a fellow of the American Association for the Advancement of Science in 1978, a member of the United States National Academy of Sciences in 1983 and a fellow of the American Academy of Arts and Sciences in 1985. She served as the president of the Genetics Society of America in 1982–3 and of the American Society for Cell Biology in 1985–6.

Research
Pardue's work with Gall on developing the technique of in situ hybridization has been highly influential. Work in her research group at MIT has focused on telomeres in the chromosomes of the model organism Drosophila (fruit flies), with particular interest in the retrotransposon elements that maintain Drosophila telomeres, unlike many other organisms in which the enzyme telomerase performs much the same function. Her work is believed to be evolutionarily related to telomerase-generated telomeres, which highlights the theory that parasitic transposable elements could have possibly evolved from mechanisms in the cell that exist to maintain chromosomal health. Pardue's 1969 publication entitled Molecular hybridization of radioactive DNA to the DNA of cytological preparations, focused on the radioactive DNA localization in the nuclei of ovarian cells in Xenopus. Through her work, she was able to conclude that the localization of binding in the oocytes of Xenopus is specific. Pardue also found that hybridization reactions with radioactive DNA  were able to discriminate between different types of DNA.

References

External links

A Conversation with Mary-Lou Pardue from MIT Video

University of Tennessee alumni
Yale University alumni
Massachusetts Institute of Technology School of Science faculty
Members of the United States National Academy of Sciences
Fellows of the American Academy of Arts and Sciences
Living people
College of William & Mary alumni
Year of birth missing (living people)